Tyniec  is a village in the administrative district of Gmina Oksa, within Jędrzejów County, Świętokrzyskie Voivodeship, in south-central Poland.

References

Villages in Jędrzejów County